The Union of Evangelical Baptist Churches of Chile is a Baptist Christian denomination in Chile. It is affiliated with the Baptist World Alliance. The headquarters is in Santiago.

History
The Union of Evangelical Baptist Churches of Chile has its origins in a mission of Pastor Daniel T. MacDonald in 1890 It is officially founded in 2002.  According to a denomination census released in 2020, it claimed 525 churches and 25,208 members.

See also
 Bible
 Born again
 Baptist beliefs
 Worship service (evangelicalism)
 Jesus Christ
 Believers' Church

References

External links
 Official Website

Baptist denominations in South America
Baptist Christianity in Chile